Public Speaking and Influencing Men In Business is a 1937 revision of Dale Carnegie's 1926 book Public Speaking: a Practical Course for Business Men.  Dorothy Carnegie produced 2 separate revised editions:  How to Develop Self-Confidence and Influence People by Public Speaking (1956), aimed at the general public, and The Quick and Easy Way to Effective Speaking (1962), as a replacement textbook for the Dale Carnegie Course.  A more recent revised edition is Public Speaking for Success (2005), revised by Arthur Pell, which restores content that was left out of the Dorothy Carnegie-revised works.

Public Speaking: a Practical Course for Business Men, Public Speaking and Influencing Men In Business, and The Quick and Easy Way to Effective Speaking served as standard textbooks in the Dale Carnegie Course.

The main focus of this book is to present a thorough understanding of the principles of public speaking, as well as guidance into conquering the fears attributed to public speaking.

Contents
 Developing Courage and Self Confidence
 Self-Confidence thru Preparation
 How Famous Speakers Prepared Their Addresses
 The Improvement of Memory
 Keeping the Audience Awake
 Essential Elements in Successful Speaking
 The Secret of Good Delivery
 Platform Presence and Personality
 How to Open a Talk
 Capturing Your Audience at Once
 How to Close a Talk
 How to Make your Meaning Clear
 How to Be Impressive and Convincing
 How to Interest your Audience
 How to Get Action
 Improving your Diction

Appendices
 Acres of Diamond by Russell Conwell
 A Message to Garcia by Elbert Hubbard
 As a Man Thinketh by James Allen

External links
Keynote Speakers
Influence Speaker
 Full text of Public Speaking: a Practical Course for Business Men at HathiTrust Digital Library: Volume 1 Volume 2

1926 non-fiction books
Business books
Public speaking
Books by Dale Carnegie